Persoonia rigida, commonly known as the rigid-, hairy- or stiff geebung, is a species of flowering plant in the family Proteaceae and is endemic to south-eastern Australia.

Description
Flowering occurs from November to March. The proportion of flowers going on to develop fruit appears to be unusually high in P. rigida compared with other members of the genus.

Taxonomy
Collected by George Caley in 1804, P. rigida was first formally described in 1830 by Scottish botanist Robert Brown in the Supplementum to his Prodromus Florae Novae Hollandiae et Insulae Van Diemen. 

Within the genus Persoonia, P. rigida is classified in the lanceolata group, a group of 54 closely related species with similar flowers but very different foliage. These species will often interbreed with each other where two members of the group occur.

Distribution and habitat
Rigid geebung is found from the Liverpool Range in central New South Wales southwards into mid-western Victoria. It grows in sandstone-based or rocky soils in dry sclerophyll forest or heathland. It has been known to hybridise with the prickly geebung (P. juniperina) and P. sericea. Associated tree species in Victoria include Eucalyptus macrorhyncha and Eucalyptus polyanthemos.

Use in horticulture
Persoonia rigida was cultivated in England in 1824 but is seldom seen in gardens now, and has little horticultural appeal.

References

rigida
Flora of New South Wales
Flora of Victoria (Australia)
Flora of the Australian Capital Territory
Taxa named by Robert Brown (botanist, born 1773)
Plants described in 1830